The 1906 Texas Longhorns football team represented the University of Texas at Austin in the 1906 college football season. In their second year under head coach H. R. Schenker, the Longhorns compiled a 9–1 record and outscored opponents by a total of 201 to 60.

Schedule

References

Texas
Texas Longhorns football seasons
Texas Longhorns football